Mr. Puttaswamy is a 1998 Indian Kannada-language action drama film directed by V. Umakanth and produced by H. C. Srinivas. The film features Shiva Rajkumar, Laali and Suman in the lead roles. The film's score and soundtrack is composed by V. Manohar.

Cast 
 Shiva Rajkumar 
 Laali
 Suman
 Avinash
 Srinath
 Lokesh
 Bank Janardhan
 Jyothi
 M. S. Umesh
 Sanket Kashi
 Mandeep Roy
 Rangayana Raghu

Soundtrack 
The soundtrack of the film was composed by V. Manohar.

References

External links 
 

1998 films
1990s Kannada-language films
Indian action drama films
Films scored by V. Manohar
1990s action drama films